Castello Gizzi (Italian for Gizzi Castle)  is a fortified palace in Torre de' Passeri, Province of Pescara (Abruzzo).

History

Architecture

References

External links

Gizzi
Torre de' Passeri